Ona is a village and an island group located in Ålesund Municipality in Møre og Romsdal county, Norway. The two islands are collectively referred to as Ona.

The historic village of Ona covers most of the tiny island of Ona. The highest point on Ona, the Onakalven cliff, is the site of the Ona Lighthouse, which was built in 1867. The lighthouse and the tiny island itself has become a well known tourist spot in Western Norway. It has a ferry connection with the other islands in Sandøy and to the island of Gossa in Aukra Municipality.

The island has a population of about 40, with a gradually diminishing population for the last 50 years. Ona has been populated for centuries because of the proximity to the fishing grounds further out to the Atlantic Ocean, and fishing has traditionally been the only source of income. Lately, several pottery artists have moved to the island.

Ona was featured, along with "Morning Song" by Babe Rainbow, in the Allstate Insurance Company's (U.S.) television commercial in 2020.

See also
 List of fishing villages
 List of islands of Norway

References

Ålesund
Fishing communities
Islands of Møre og Romsdal
Villages in Møre og Romsdal